Robert X. Golphin is an American actor, writer/director, author, speaker and journalist from Philadelphia, Pennsylvania. He is best known for his role as Dunbar Reed in The Great Debaters.

Education
Golphin holds an MFA in screenwriting from Spalding University,  a B.A. in theater and film (magna cum laude) from St. Augustine's University and a diploma in creative writing from the Philadelphia High School for the Creative and Performing Arts.

Career

Golphin's film roles include Remember the Daze, "Rounding First", Punch Me, "The Underground Kings" and "Essential". His television and new media credits include the HBO series The Wire, the HBO miniseries John Adams (2008), and "The Counterparts". Among his theatrical credits are "The Storm: An Original Pop-Rock Musical" (2012), "Englewood Boys: A Play on Portraiture"(2015), and "Bessie Smith: Empress of the Blues" (2019). 

In 2020, Golphin made his feature length directorial debut with "Freshman Friday", which was released on Amazon Prime Video. He has also written, produced, and/or directed several award-winning short films that have screened at national and international film festivals. During his final semester of undergraduate studies at St. Augustine's University, he directed and produced an authorized stage medley of Spike Lee's School Daze.

Golphin's journalism background includes a four-year stint as an on-air correspondent for Reelblack TV, and published credits in The Philadelphia Inquirer 'First Take' Newspaper, The Philadelphia Sunday Sun, SCOOP USA Newspaper, The Manning Times, The Campbell Times, and Teen People Magazine among others.

He is also the author of the novellas, "Cold Night In A Warm Season" (2021) and "Abandoning Adam: Confessions of an HBCU Scholar" (2006).

Filmography

Acting (Film & TV)

Film/TV (Crew)

Theatre (Crew)

Books

Awards

Acting

Filmmaking

References

1. Philadelphia Tribune
2.Philadelphia Tribune (Metro Edition)
3.
4.Philadelphia Tribune's "Entertainment Now"
5.Variety
6.Scoop USA Newspaper
7.Philly AD Club
8.Movie Bytes
9."Rounding First" official website
10.Entertainment Now:Philadelphia Tribune
11. Robert X. Golphin ("Punch Me") Featured In The HBCU Digest
12. Atlantic City CineFest List Of Nominations for 2011
13. Blog Talk Radio Interview With Robert X. Golphin on The Joy Keys Morning Show
14. Blog Talk Radio Interview with Robert X. Golphin on Solutions Radio with S. Denice Newton
15. Blog Talk Radio Interview with Robert X. Golphin on AfterThoughts Radio with S. Denice Newton
16. Blog Talk Radio Interview with Robert X. Golphin on Urban Film Radio
17. Philadelphia Tribune Feature Story About Robert X. Golphin and "Punch Me"
18. List of Competition Finalist Screenplays
19. Indiewire/Shadow & Act
20. "J Blair Presents" Radio Show Interview w/ Robert X. Golphin (2013)
21. Reelblack Presents Monthly Showcase Sneak Preview of "The Counterparts"
22. NBA All Star Executive Produces Gritty Police Drama The Underground Kings
23. Gritty Police Drama The Underground Kings Slated To Premiere in January

External links
 
 
 Official Twitter Profile
 Official Fan Page on Facebook

American male actors
Living people
1982 births
St. Augustine's University (North Carolina) alumni
Spalding University alumni
Philadelphia High School for the Creative and Performing Arts alumni